Broken ‘n’ English is an English hip-hop rap group from Manchester.

Konny Kon was originally part of the rap group Children of Zeus. Both bands were part of a local movement of Manchester musicians.

History 
Konny Kon was part of the group Children of Zeus and formed Broke ‘n’ English in 2004. They released their first mixtape, Terms and Conditions.

They performed with M.I.A in 2007. Eventually they did a concert on 2010.

Strategy, a member of the group also goes on his own to make music. He released “Carbon Footprint”. This song was featured on the 2022 racing video game Need for Speed: Unbound.

Discography 
Albums

 Terms and Conditions (2005)
 Subject 2 Status (2007)

References 

English hip hop groups
Musical groups established in 2004 
Musical groups from Manchester
Grime music groups